Collabs Tape is an official mixtape by American rapper and producer Kool Keith. It was released on June 27, 2006 for Junkadelic Zikmu and was produced by Kool Keith and DJ Junkaz Lou. The entire CD consisted of collaborations Keith had done with other artists, including Analog Brothers, Born 2wice, Brainpower, Clayborne Family, Esham, Guru, Princess Superstar, Smut Peddlers, The Cenobites, The Diesel Truckers, The Prodigy, Tim Dog, Viktor Vaughn, and Ol' Dirty Bastard.

Track listing

Personnel 

Keith Matthew Thornton – main performer, executive producer, producer, photography
Louis Gomis – performer (track 1), mixing, scratching
DJ Marrrtin a.k.a. Dirty Dezer – mixing assistant
Larry Hutch – mastering
Nator – coordinator
J. Graphics – artwork & design
Sean Merrick – performer (tracks: 7, 9, 12, 23, 32, 37)
Marc Giveand – performer (tracks: 7, 12, 24, 37)
Timothy Blair – performer (tracks: 8, 16, 37)
Rodney Chapman – performer (tracks: 11, 28, 41)
Christopher Rodgers – performer (tracks: 19, 27, 36)
Nancy Des Rose – performer (tracks: 4, 39)
Tracy Lauren Marrow – performer (tracks: 33, 38)
Bobbito Garcia – performer (track 25)
Cary Guy – performer (track 10)
Cedric Ulmont Miller – performer (track 40)
Concetta Kirschner – performer (track 31)
Daniel Dumile – performer (track 13)
Derek Barbosa – performer (track 6)
Derek Murphy – performer (track 18)
Dorothy Smith – performer (track 10)
Eric Meltzer – performer (track 25)
Esham Attica Smith – performer (track 42)
Gert-Jan Mulder – performer (track 35)
Heather Keisha Hunter – performer (track 42)
John Percy Simon – performer (track 41)
Joshua Adam Gent – performer (track 21)
Keith Edward Elam – performer (track 10)
Liam Howlett – performer (track 22)
Milo Berger – performer (track 25)
Olan Thompson – performer (track 36)
Paul Laster – performer (track 26)
Phillip Collington – performer (track 3)
Pierre Maddox – performer (track 16)
Roger Troutman – performer (track 15)
Russell Tyrone Jones – performer (track 2)
Taura Taylor-Mendoza – performer (track 5)
Tsidi Ibrahim – performer (track 25)
Dr. Octopuss – performer (track 7)
Earatik Statik – performers (track 19)
R. Tiano – performer (track 23)
Rhymestyle – performer (track 36)
Sinistre – performer (track 7)
Smut Peddlers – performers (track 34)

References

Kool Keith albums
2006 mixtape albums